Perdur Radhakantha Adiga (5 May 1935 – 13 September 2006) was an Indian endocrine biochemist, reproductive biologist, INSA Senior Scientist and an Astra chair professor of the Indian Institute of Science. He was known for his researches on vitamin-carrier proteins and Lathyrus sativus and was an elected fellow of the Indian Academy of Sciences and the Indian National Science Academy. The Council of Scientific and Industrial Research, the apex agency of the Government of India for scientific research, awarded him the Shanti Swarup Bhatnagar Prize for Science and Technology, one of the highest Indian science awards for his contributions to Medical Sciences in 1980.

Biography 

P. R. Adiga, born on 5 May 1935 at Barkur, a small hamlet in Udupi district of the south Indian state of Karnataka as one among the ten children of his parents, did his early schooling at local schools and earned a master's degree in biochemistry from the University of Kerala in the neighboring state. Subsequently, he joined the Indian Institute of Science as a research associate and pursued his doctoral studies under the guidance of P. S. Sarma, who headed the department of biochemistry, to secure the degree in 1963. He spent his entire career at IISc, holding various positions as that of an assistant professor, associate professor and professor. He also chaired the erstwhile Centre for Reproductive Biology and Molecular Endocrinology at the institute. Post retirement, he continued his association with IISc as an INSA Senior scientist.

Adiga's early researches were focused on the growth and intermediary metabolism of fungi and insects and how they were impacted by the trace elements and metal toxicity. His work on Lathyrus sativus, commonly known as grass pea, revealed that N-oxalyl-diaminopropionic acid, a neurotoxin present in the plant caused the neurological disorder of neurolathyrism in humans. He was also credited with the discovery of Homoarginine, an amino acid derivative, found in Lathyrus sativus. Later, he worked on vitamin-carrying proteins which demonstrated how the proteins carried vitamins such as thiamin and riboflavin to the foetus and his experiments on rodents showed antibodies generated during pregnancy might cause its termination. He documented his researches by way of several articles in peer-reviewed journals and the online article repository of the Indian Academy of Sciences has listed 192 of them. He edited the book, Perspectives in Primate Reproductive Biology and contributed chapters to many books published by others; his work has been cited by a number of authors and researchers. He was also associated with two journals, Journal of Biosciences and Molecular and Cellular Endocrinology as a member of their editorial boards.

Adiga died on 13 September 2006, at the age of 71, survived by his wife and two daughters.

Awards and honors 
Adiga won the Giri Memorial Medal of the Indian Institute of Science in 1963, for his PhD thesis. The Council of Scientific and Industrial Research awarded him Shanti Swarup Bhatnagar Prize, one of the highest Indian science awards, in 1980. Two years later, he received the Sanjay Gandhi Award for Science and Technology, the same year that he was elected as a fellow to the Indian Academy of Sciences. The Society of Biological Chemists (India) awarded him the Professor M. Srinivasayya Award in 1984 and the Indian National Science Academy elected him as a fellow the same year. His award orations include the Professor M. R. N. Prasad Memorial lecture of the Indian National Science Academy in 1992.

Selected bibliography

Chapters

Articles

See also 
 Nuggehalli Raghuveer Moudgal

Notes

References

External links 
 

Recipients of the Shanti Swarup Bhatnagar Award in Medical Science
Indian medical writers
1935 births
2006 deaths
Indian biochemists
University of Kerala alumni
Indian Institute of Science alumni
Academic staff of the Indian Institute of Science
People from Udupi district
Fellows of the Indian Academy of Sciences
Fellows of the Indian National Science Academy
20th-century Indian chemists